The 2018 Americas Rugby Challenge or ARCh 2018 was the inaugural edition of the Americas Rugby Challenge, a men's rugby union international tournament for tier 2 teams in North and South America. The inaugural edition was confirmed in August 2018, to be played at the Estadio Cincuentenario in Medellín, Colombia from August 24 to September 1.

The competition brings together Rugby Americas North (RAN) and Sudamérica Rugby, following the example of the Americas Rugby Championship (ARC). The Americas Rugby Challenge is officially the ‘B’ competition for the ARC.

As is the case of the Americas Rugby Championship, the new Americas Rugby Challenge saw all countries playing against each other. The first edition of the competition was a Four Nations tournament with Rugby Americas North and Sudamérica Rugby both having two representatives each.

The host nation, Colombia, was joined by Sudamérica Rugby rivals Paraguay. Guyana and Mexico represented Rugby Americas North. Colombia won the first edition.

Teams

Table

Fixtures

Match day 1

Match day 2

Match day 3

References

Americas Rugby Challenge
2018 in Colombian sport
International sports competitions hosted by Colombia
Americas Rugby Challenge
Americas Rugby Challenge
Americas Rugby Challenge
Sport in Medellín